In The Valley is the debut EP from English punk rock band Great Cynics. It was released on Kind of Like Records in February 2012.

Track listing

Personnel
Great Cynics
Giles Bidder - Vocals/Guitar
Iona Cairns - Vocals/Bass
Bob Barrett - Drums

References

2012 EPs
Great Cynics albums